Arnaud Valois (born 29 February 1984) is a French actor who was born in Lyon. He began his career in 2006. He played the protagonist Nathan, in the 2017 movie BPM (Beats per Minute) (120 battements par minute).

Career 
Valois ceased studies at law school and began to study acting at the Cours Florent drama school for two years. After a series of rejections as an actor, Valois left France and studied massage at Wat Pho in Bangkok and worked as a massage therapist in Thailand for six years. He returned to Paris to open a massage studio. He was invited to act in 120 BPM after Robin Campillo read his Facebook profile.

In 2017, with the international release of 120 BPM, the film's campaign for the 2018 Oscars nominations, and his ability to speak English, he became known internationally. Vanity Fair ranked him as the eleventh most influential French person in the world in 2017.

Personal life 
Valois is openly gay.

Filmography

References

External links
 

1984 births
Living people
21st-century French male actors
Male actors from Lyon
French male film actors
French gay actors
Most Promising Actor Lumières Award winners
21st-century French LGBT people